Ville-sur-Lumes is a commune in the Ardennes department, and Grand Est in northern France.

Population

Housing
In 2007 there were 185 homes, 177 were the primary family home, 6 were second homes and 2 were unused. 181 were houses and 4 were apartments. Of the 177 primary dwellings, 137 were occupied by their owners, 34 were leased and occupied by tenants and 6 were assigned free of charge, 3 had two chambers, 21 had three, 60 had four rooms, and 93 had five or more. 156 houses had a parking lot. 66 households had a single car and 94 has two or more.

Economy
In 2007 the population of the working age was 295 people, 217 were active and 78 were inactive. Of the 217 active people 197 were employed (109 men and 88 women). 20 were unemployed (6 men and 14 women). Of the 78 inactive 34 were retired, 27 were students and 17 were classified as "other inactive".
In 2007, a total of 13 establishments existed. One was a mining company, one was a manufacturer or other industrial, there were 5 construction companies, a trading company and an auto repair, a transport company, a service company, an entity of public administration and 2 companies classified as "other service activities." Of the 5 places of service to individuals in 2009, there was a painter, plasterer, two timber companies, a plumber, and a hairdresser.
In 2000 there were three farms.

Geography
In the north of France, Ville-sur-Lumes is near the border with Belgium. Nearby towns include St. Lawrence, Lumes, Issancourt-et-Rumeli, Gernelle, The Grandville, Villers-Semeuse, Aiglemont and Vivier au Court.

See also
Communes of the Ardennes department

References

Communes of Ardennes (department)
Ardennes communes articles needing translation from French Wikipedia